The year 1934 in television involved some significant events.
Below is a list of television-related events during 1934.


Events
March 31 – The agreement for joint experimental transmissions by the BBC and John Logie Baird's company ends.
May 16 – The Seldon Committee is established to investigate the feasibility of a public television service in the UK.
July 11 – In the U.S., the Communications Act of 1934 stipulates that commercial television stations "operate in the public interest, convenience, and necessity". The Federal Communications Commission (FCC) is charged with the responsibility of enforcing the act.
August 25 – Philo Farnsworth gives the world's first public demonstration of a complete all-electronic television system at the Franklin Institute in Philadelphia.
November 5 – First television broadcasts in the USSR.
Late 1934 – Vladimir K. Zworykin increases the number of scanning lines in electronic television from 240 lines at 24 frames per second to 343 lines at 30 frames.

Births
January 8 – Roy Kinnear, comedian (died 1988)
January 21 - Ann Wedgeworth, actress, Three's Company, Evening Shade (died 2017)
January 22 – Bill Bixby, television actor, My Favorite Martian, The Incredible Hulk (died 1993)
January 26 – Bob Uecker, sports commentator, actor
February 11 - Tina Louise, actress and singer, Gilligan's Island
February 12 – Bill Russell, NBA basketball player
February 13 - George Segal, actor, Just Shoot Me!, The Goldbergs (died 2021)
February 14 – Florence Henderson, actress, The Brady Bunch (died 2016)
February 21 – Rue McClanahan, actress, The Golden Girls (died 2010)
February 27 - Van Williams, actor, Bourbon Street Beat, Surfside 6, The Green Hornet (died 2016)
March 1 - Joan Hackett, actress (died 1983)
March 5 – James Sikking, actor, Hill Street Blues, Doogie Howser, M.D.
March 9 - Joyce Van Patten, actress
March 31 - Shirley Jones, singer and actress, The Partridge Family
April 1 - Don Hastings, actor, As the World Turns
April 5 - Frank Glieber, sportscaster (died 1985)
April 18 - James Drury, actor, The Virginian (died 2020)
April 24 – Shirley MacLaine, actress and author
May 18 - Dwayne Hickman, actor, The Bob Cummings Show, The Many Loves of Dobie Gillis (died 2022)
May 19 - Jim Lehrer, presidential debate moderator and host of the PBS NewsHour (died 2020)
June 4 - Bill Moyers, journalist
July 1 - Jamie Farr, actor, M*A*S*H
July 10 – Jerry Nelson, muppeteer, Sesame Street, The Muppet Show (died 2012)
July 22 - Louise Fletcher, actress
August 5 - Gay Byrne, broadcaster, host of The Late Late Show (died 2019)
August 7 - Steve Ihnat, actor (died 1972)
August 9 - Cynthia Harris, actress, Mad About You (died 2021)
September 2 - Chuck McCann, actor and television host (died 2018)
September 19 - Jay Randolph, sportscaster
September 20 - Sophia Loren, actress
September 27 - Wilford Brimley, Actor And Commercial Spokesperson (Actor: The Natural (As Pop Fisher), Cocoon (As Ben Luckett), Ewoks: The Battle For Endor (1985) (As Noa Briqualon). Commercial Spokesperson For Quaker Oats And Liberty Medical) (died 2020)
October 17 - Kathleen Watkins, broadcaster
October 18 - Chuck Swindoll, pastor
November 13 - Garry Marshall, actor and director, Happy Days, (died 2016)
December 9 – Judi Dench, English actress, As Time Goes By
December 28 - Maggie Smith, English actress, Downton Abbey

References